Chestnut Ridge may refer to:

 Chestnut Ridge, Bedford County, a mountain ridge in Pennsylvania
 Chestnut Ridge, Indiana, an unincorporated community in Jackson County
 Chestnutridge, Missouri, an unincorporated community in Christian County
 Chestnut Ridge, Missouri, an unincorporated community in Ste. Genevieve County
 Chestnut Ridge, New Jersey, an unincorporated community in Bergen County
 Chestnut Ridge, New York, a village in the town of Ramapo
 Chestnut Ridge, West Virginia, an unincorporated community in Monongalia County
 Chestnut Ridge Park, in Orchard Park, New York
 Chestnut Ridge people, a Melungeon community residing near Philippi, West Virginia
 Chestnut Ridge (Laurel Highlands), in the Laurel Highlands of southwestern Pennsylvania
 Chestnut Ridge (Aberdeen, Maryland), a home on the National Register of Historic Places